Mike Huckabee has unsuccessfully run for president twice, it may refer to:

 Mike Huckabee 2008 presidential campaign
 Mike Huckabee 2016 presidential campaign